Reserva may refer to:
 Reserve Wine

Places 
Reserva, Paraná, Brazil
Reserva do Cabaçal, Mato Grosso, Brazil
Reserva do Iguaçu, Paraná, Brazil
Reserva (Buenos Aires), Argentina

See also 
 Reserve (disambiguation)
 Reservation (disambiguation)